The Woodstock Letters were a periodical publication by the Society of Jesus. Originally published by Woodstock College in Maryland, the letters were intended for distribution among of the Jesuits in North America and later South America. They recounted the Society's works, obituaries of fellow Jesuits, pertinent events, histories of Jesuit institutions, and book reviews. The letters were first published in 1872 and counted 317 volumes before being discontinued in 1969.

References

External links 

 Woodstock Letters archive at the American Jesuit Archives
 Woodstock Letters archive at Saint Louis University
 Woodstock Letters index at Boston College's Jesuit Online Library

Book series introduced in 1872
Publications established in 1872
1872 establishments in Maryland
1969 disestablishments in Maryland
Defunct magazines published in the United States